Hevel Yavne Regional Council (Mo'atza Azorit Hevel Yavneh, lit. Yavne Region Regional Council) is a regional council in the Central District of Israel.

History
The Hevel Yavne Regional Council was formed in 1950. It covers 32,000 dunams and six religious communities. Two yeshivas -  Yeshivat Kerem BeYavne and Yeshivat Neve Herzog are under its purview.

It is bordered to the north by Yavne and Gan Raveh Regional Council; to the east by Gederot and Brenner Regional Councils; to the south by Be'er Tuvia Regional Council, and to the west by Ashdod.

List of communities
The council covers one kibbutz, four moshavim and two youth villages;

External links
Official website 

 
Regional councils in Israel
Religious Israeli communities